The 2016 UNOH 200 was the 13th stock car race of the 2016 NASCAR Camping World Truck Series, and the 19th iteration of the event. The race was held on Wednesday, August 17, 2016, in Bristol, Tennessee, at Bristol Motor Speedway, a 0.533-mile (0.858 km) permanent oval shaped racetrack. The race took the scheduled 200 laps to complete. In an exciting battle for the win, Ben Kennedy, driving for GMS Racing, held off Brett Moffitt in the final 6 laps, and earned his first career NASCAR Camping World Truck Series win. Christopher Bell dominated the majority of the race, leading 102 laps. To fill out the podium, Daniel Hemric, driving for Brad Keselowski Racing, would finish 3rd, respectively.

Background 

Bristol Motor Speedway, formerly known as Bristol International Raceway and Bristol Raceway, is a NASCAR short track venue located in Bristol, Tennessee. Constructed in 1960, it held its first NASCAR race on July 30, 1961. Bristol is among the most popular tracks on the NASCAR schedule because of its distinct features, which include extraordinarily steep banking, an all-concrete surface, two pit roads, and stadium-like seating. It has also been named one of the loudest NASCAR tracks. The track is billed as the "World's Fastest Half-Mile"

Entry list 

 (R) denotes rookie driver.
 (i) denotes driver who is ineligible for series driver points.

Practice

First practice 
The first practice session was held on Wednesday, August 17, at 9:30 am EST, and would last for 55 minutes.

Final practice 
The final practice session was held on Wednesday, August 17, at 11:30 am EST, and would last for 55 minutes.

Qualifying 
Qualifying was held on Wednesday, August 17, at 4:45 pm EST. Since Bristol Motor Speedway is under 1.5 miles (2.4 km) in length, the qualifying system is a multi-car system that included three rounds. The first round was 15 minutes, where every driver would be able to set a lap within the 15 minutes. Then, the second round would consist of the fastest 24 cars in Round 1, and drivers would have 10 minutes to set a lap. Round 3 consisted of the fastest 12 drivers from Round 2, and the drivers would have 5 minutes to set a time. Whoever was fastest in Round 3 would win the pole. 

Jake Griffin, Clay Greenfield, and Cody McMahan would fail to qualify.

Full qualifying results

Race results

Standings after the race 

Drivers' Championship standings

Note: Only the first 8 positions are included for the driver standings.

References 

NASCAR races at Bristol Motor Speedway
August 2016 sports events in the United States
2016 in sports in Tennessee